Dan Kayede is a Ghanaian former professional footballer who played for Accra Great Olympics F.C. At the international level, he is known for his involvement in the squad that won the 1978 African Cup of Nations.

Club career 
Ansah started his career Accra Great Olympics. He rose to become an integral member of the senior team.

International career 
Ansah was a member of the Ghana national team from 1977 to 1984. He was key member of the squad that played in both the and 1978, 1980 African Cup of Nations helping Ghana to make history as the first country to win the competition three times and for keeps during the 1978 edition, after scoring Uganda 2–0 in the finals.

Personal life 
Kayede's brother is Ben Kayede, who is also an international footballer who won the 1982 AFCON playing for Ghana.

Honours 
Club

Accra Great Olympics

 Ghanaian FA Cup: 1983
International

Ghana

 African Cup of Nations: 1978

References

External links 

 

Living people
Association football forwards
Ghanaian footballers
Accra Great Olympics F.C. players
Ghana Premier League players
Ghana international footballers
1978 African Cup of Nations players
1980 African Cup of Nations players
Africa Cup of Nations-winning players
Year of birth missing (living people)